Pierre Berthelot (born 1943) is a mathematician at the University of Rennes. He developed crystalline cohomology and rigid cohomology.

Publications
Berthelot, Pierre Cohomologie cristalline des schémas de caractéristique p>0.  Lecture Notes in Mathematics, Vol. 407. Springer-Verlag, Berlin-New York, 1974. 604 pp.
Berthelot, Pierre; Ogus, Arthur Notes on crystalline cohomology. Princeton University Press, Princeton, N.J.; University of Tokyo Press, Tokyo, 1978. vi+243 pp.

References
Home page of Pierre Berthelot

External links
 Author profile in the database zbMATH

Living people
École Normale Supérieure alumni
Algebraic geometers
20th-century French mathematicians
University of Paris alumni
Academic staff of the University of Rennes
1943 births
21st-century French mathematicians